The Água Vermelha Dam is an embankment dam on the Grande River near Iturama in Minas Gerais/São Paulo, Brazil. It was constructed for hydroelectric power production and flood control. Construction on the dam began in 1973 and it was completed and operational by 1978. The last generators were operational in 1979.

Specifications

See also

List of power stations in Brazil

References

Dams completed in 1978
Energy infrastructure completed in 1979
Dams in Minas Gerais
Hydroelectric power stations in Brazil
Embankment dams
Dams on the Rio Grande (Paraná River tributary)
Dams in São Paulo (state)